Částkov may refer to the following places in the Czech Republic:

 Částkov (Tachov District), village in Tachov District
 Částkov (Uherské Hradiště District), village in Uherské Hradiště District

See also
 Častkov